Ishaya may refer to:

Ishaya Mark Aku (died 2002), Nigerian Minister of Sports
Ishaya Audu (1927–2005), Nigerian doctor, professor, and politician
Matthew Ishaya Audu (born 1959), Nigerian prelate of the Catholic Church
Ishaya Bako (born 1986), Nigerian film director and screenwriter
Ishaya Bakut (1947–2015), Military Governor of Benue State in Nigeria
Ishaya Bamaiyi, GCON (born 1949), retired Nigerian Army Lieutenant General and former Chief of Army Staff
Ishaya Shamasha Dawid Bet-Zia (1906–1985), Assyrian author, writer, and poet
Ishaya Ibrahim (1952–2022), the 18th Chief of the Nigerian Naval Staff
Tanko Ishaya, Nigerian professor of computer science, vice chancellor of the University of Jos
William Ishaya, Iraqi diplomat
Ishaya Shekari, the military Governor of Kano State